Norbert Ringels (Mönchengladbach, 16 September 1956) is a retired German football player. He spent ten seasons in the Bundesliga with Borussia Mönchengladbach, where he was known as "Nonno" to his teammates.

Honours
 European Cup: runner-up 1976–77
 UEFA Cup: 1978–79; runner-up 1979–80
 Bundesliga: 1975–76, 1976–77; runner-up: 1977–78
 DFB-Pokal: runner-up 1983–84

References

External links
 

1956 births
Living people
German footballers
Borussia Mönchengladbach players
VVV-Venlo players
Bundesliga players
UEFA Cup winning players
Association football defenders
West German footballers
West German expatriate footballers
Expatriate footballers in the Netherlands
West German expatriate sportspeople in the Netherlands
Sportspeople from Mönchengladbach
Footballers from North Rhine-Westphalia